The Emeril Lagasse Show is a weekly talk show starring Emeril Lagasse. It aired on Sundays at 5:00PM Eastern on Ion Television.  The program originally premiered on April 18, 2010, airing at 8:00PM.

The announcement of the show was made by Emeril on Martha in late January 2010. The show was filmed live before a studio audience and has featured a similar format of Emeril Live and also featured celebrities making guest appearances. A band plays music and interact with Lagasse and guests, plus the show has featured field pieces shot in and around New York City where the show was taped.

The show featured house band Dave Koz & The Kozmos, featuring Dave Koz (saxophone), Jeff Golub (guitar), Philippe Saisse (keyboards), Conrad Korsch (bass guitar), and Skoota Warner (drums).

This was Ion TV's first American original show since its short-lived original drama Palmetto Pointe in 2005. For reasons unknown, it was cancelled in July 2010.

International Broadcasts
In Australia, the show is broadcast on the Seven Network's multi-channel 7TWO on Sunday afternoons.

References

2010 American television series debuts
American television talk shows
2010 American television series endings
Ion Television original programming